Women's 10 metre air pistol was one of the fifteen shooting events at the 1996 Summer Olympics. Olga Klochneva won the event on a new Olympic record, and the defending champion, Marina Logvinenko, completed the Russian double by defeating Mariya Grozdeva in a shoot-off for the silver medal.

Qualification round

OR Olympic record – Q Qualified for final

Final

OR Olympic record

References

Sources

Shooting at the 1996 Summer Olympics
Olymp
Shoo